Jeanne Cavelos (born May 26, 1960 in Summit, New Jersey) is an American science fiction writer, editor, and former NASA astrophysicist. She is the founder and a main director of the Odyssey Writing Workshop. She is the author of The Science of Star Wars and is the first person documented saying "May the 4th Be with You," which has led to the creation of "Star Wars Day" on May 4th.

Early Life and Scientific Career 
Cavelos began writing science fiction as a child, but wanted to do something that she felt was more important. Inspired by Charlton Heston in Planet of the Apes, Cavelos decided to study astrophysics with the goal of becoming an astronaut. She went on to receive her BS in astronomy from Michigan State University in 1982. 

Cavelos first worked as an astrophysicist and mathematician. She taught astronomy at Michigan State University and Cornell University and worked at the Astronaut Training Museum at NASA's Johnson Space Center.  

However, she became dissatisfied with working in astronomy. She realized that she liked thinking about big questions, like the creation of the universe, rather than the smaller issues she had to focus on in research or at NASA. Science-fiction also gave her the ability to have freedom to explore ideas and consequences. This love led to her decision to attend American University to earn her MFA in Creative Writing.

Editing and Writing Careers 

Cavelos transitioned into the publishing field, working as a senior editor for Bantam Doubleday Dell. While working there, she launched the Abyss imprint, of horror, and Cutting Edge imprint, of noir literary fiction. She also ran the science fiction/fantasy publishing program and edited a wide range of fiction and nonfiction. As an editor, she became known for discovering and nurturing new authors, and won a World Fantasy Award. She worked with authors including  William F. Nolan, Joan Vinge, Robert Anton Wilson, Dennis Etchison, Tanith Lee, Kathe Koja, Poppy Z. Brite, J. M. Dillard, David Wingrove, Barry Gifford, Patrick McCabe, and Peter Dickinson.

While working at Dell, Cavelos contacted J. Michael Straczynski to discuss the novelizations of Babylon 5. She began the novel line with Dell before leaving publishing to focus on her writing career in 1994. After receiving a form letter with an idea for the book, she set aside the novel that she had been writing and wrote a proposal for the Babylon 5 book, which led to The Shadow Within.

Cavelos then wrote the non-fiction books The Science of the X-files, followed by The Science of Star Wars. In The Science of Star Wars, she possibly coined the phrase "May the 4th Be with You," which has led to the creation of "Star Wars Day" on May 4th. 

Cavelos went on to author the Babylon 5 Passing of the Techno-Mages trilogy. 

In 2004 Cavelos edited The Many Faces of Van Helsing, an anthology of horror and fantasy stories about Abraham Van Helsing written by masters of the genres. The anthology was nominated for a Bram Stoker Award.

Cavelos has continued to teach, shifting her focus from astronomy and mathematics to creative writing. In 1994, she began teaching advanced fiction writing at Saint Anselm College. In 1996, Cavelos and founded Odyssey Writing Workshops Charitable Trust, a nonprofit that helps fiction writers improve their work. In 2015, Cavelos was nominated for a World Fantasy Award for her work as Odyssey director and instructor.

Bibliography
Babylon 5: The Passing of the Techno-Mages – Casting Shadows
Babylon 5: The Passing of the Techno-Mages – Summoning Light
Babylon 5: The Passing of the Techno-Mages – Invoking Darkness
Babylon 5: The Shadow Within
The Science of Star Wars (book)
The Science of the X-files
The Many Faces of Van Helsing

References

External links
Jeanne Cavelos official website

1960 births
Living people
20th-century American novelists
21st-century American novelists
American science fiction writers
American women short story writers
American women novelists
Women science fiction and fantasy writers
20th-century American women writers
21st-century American women writers
20th-century American short story writers
21st-century American short story writers

American editors